Bálsamo is a municipality in the state of São Paulo, Brazil. It may also refer to:

People 
 Agata Balsamo, an Italian former long-distance runner
 Anna Balsamo, an Italian poet
 Carino of Balsamo, the murderer of Saint Peter of Verona
 Elisa Balsamo (cyclist) (born 1998), Italian road and track cyclist
 Elisa Balsamo (tennis) (born 1983), Italian tennis player
 Giuseppe Balsamo, birth name of Alessandro Cagliostro
 Ignazio Balsamo, an Italian actor
 Joe Balsamo, an Italian-American football manager
 Steve Balsamo, a Welsh singer-songwriter
 Terry Balsamo, an American guitarist
 Tony Balsamo, a former Major League Baseball player
 Umberto Balsamo, an Italian singer-songwriter and composer

Other 
 Cinisello Balsamo, an Italian municipality
 Josephine Balsamo, a fictional character
 Large-flowered Balsamo, a species of plant
 Balsamus, l'uomo di Satana, an Italian horror film
Balsam of Peru, a balsam from a tree in Central and South America
 Balsamo, the Living Skull, a brazen head illusion by Joseffy